The Atlantic corridor or Atlantic motorway is a proposed road project in Ireland. The scheme, announced in 2005, was intended to link Waterford in the South-East to Letterkenny in the North-West via motorway or dual carriageway by 2015. However, in part due to the post-2008 Irish economic downturn, major sections of the roadway were delayed or cancelled.

The Atlantic Corridor, when combined with the inter-urban motorways linking Dublin and the other cities, is intended to ring the island of Ireland and to connect primary population centres.

National primary roads 
The constituent national primary routes, included in the 2007 plan, included:
N15 linking Letterkenny and Sligo
N17 linking Sligo and Galway
N18 linking Galway, Ennis and Limerick (including the Limerick Tunnel project)
N20 linking Limerick and Cork
N25 linking Cork and Waterford

Progress 
At that time, the next construction planned was the M20 from Cork to Limerick, which was allocated €850 million in government funds under the National Development Plan 2018-2027 capital scheme. The M20, which was "progressed through planning and design phases" as of 2010, is proposed to link with the planned Cork northern ring road, also forming part of the Atlantic Corridor route, connecting the planned Cork to Limerick motorway with the partially completed Cork-Waterford N25 dual carriageway.

Completed sections 
N4 Colloney to Sligo
N15 Ballyshannon/Bundoran bypass
N4 Sligo inner relief road
N17 Tuam bypass 
M17 Galway to Tuam
M18 Limerick to Galway
M20 Limerick to Patrickswell
N20 Blarney to Cork
N25 Waterford City Bypass
N25 Cork to Midleton

Proposed developments
N25 Carrigtwohill to Midleton road - construction rescheduled
M20 Patrickswell to Blarney - planning stage (as of 2020)

See also
 Western Rail Corridor
 Wild Atlantic Way
 Transport in Ireland

References

External links 
Atlantic Corridor as part of the Transport 21 website (archived 2008)

Proposed roads
Roads in the Republic of Ireland
Proposed transport infrastructure in the Republic of Ireland